Oslo Agreements may refer to:

 Oslo Agreements, 1930, an economic treaty
 Oslo Accords, agreement between Israel and the Palestinians